Palmersville is a small unincorporated community in northeastern Weakley County, Tennessee. It has a post office, with ZIP code 38241. The United States Census Bureau does not maintain demographic data for Palmersville. Palmersville is located at the intersection of Tennessee State Route 89 and Tennessee State Route 190.

Palmersville is within the 8th Congressional district represented in the U.S. House by Republican David Kustoff.

Demographics

History
Palmersville was one of the first settlements in Weakley County. It is named for one of its founders, W.R. Palmer. Minida College was built in Palmersville during the late 1800s. In 1924, the town was devastated by a fire which destroyed all but four buildings leaving only the local bank, the blacksmith shop, and two stores unscathed.

Notable people
 Pauline LaFon Gore, mother of former Vice President Al Gore
 Ned McWherter, former Governor of Tennessee

Media
WWGY 99.3 "Today's Best Music with "Ace & TJ in the Morning"
WRQR-FM 105.5 "Today's Best Music with "Ace & TJ in the Morning"
WTPR-AM 710 "The Greatest Hits of All Time"

References

External links
 
 

Unincorporated communities in Tennessee
Unincorporated communities in Weakley County, Tennessee